Charles Johnston (26 November 1911 – 1991) was a Scottish professional footballer who played as an outside left.

Career
Johnston was in the Scottish Junior Football Association setup with Blantyre Victoria before joining Motherwell in December 1932, but was rarely selected by the Steelmen before departing in 1935. He then moved on to play in the English Football League for Doncaster Rovers and Mansfield Town, before returning to Scotland to sign for Dunfermline Athletic.

His career was interrupted by World War II, during which time he moved to Rangers  for a £350 fee, making over 200 appearances for the Glasgow club and winning several trophies, but these all came in unofficial competitions. As a result of his good form with the Gers, Johnston was selected to play for the Scotland national football team in an unofficial wartime international fixture against England at Wembley in 1942.

In 1946 he joined Dumfries club Queen of the South where he spent seven seasons. With the Palmerston Park club, he picked up the 1951 Scottish B Division title and played in two major domestic cup semi-finals during one of their strongest periods, playing alongside the likes of Jim Patterson, Doug McBain and Roy Henderson.

References

1911 births
1991 deaths
Scottish footballers
Sportspeople from Larkhall
Footballers from South Lanarkshire
Association football outside forwards
English Football League players
Scottish Football League players
Scotland wartime international footballers
Scottish Junior Football Association players
Blantyre Victoria F.C. players
Motherwell F.C. players
Doncaster Rovers F.C. players
Mansfield Town F.C. players
Dunfermline Athletic F.C. players
Rangers F.C. players
Queen of the South F.C. players